The Neue Rundschau, formerly Die neue Rundschau, founded in 1890, is a quarterly German literary magazine that appears in the S. Fischer Verlag. With its over 100 years of continuous history, it is one of the oldest cultural publications in Europe.

History
The theater critic Otto Brahm and the publisher Samuel Fischer founded the magazine in 1890 as Freie Bühne für modernes Leben (Free Stage for Modern Life). They wanted to provide a weekly platform for new development in art such as naturalism. In practice, the journal was not limited to one art form. The weekly also addressed topics about theatre. In 1892, it was renamed to an art form. After discussions about the artistic focus of the magazine, it was renamed for the first time in Freie Bühne für den Entwickelungskampf der Zeit (Free Stage for the Struggle for Development of the Time), shifting to more popular content and to monthly publication. Otto Julius Bierbaum took over as editor of the magazine in 1893 and named it Neue Deutsche Rundschau. Due to differences with Samuel Fischer he gave up the post after four months.

From 1894 to 1922, Oskar Bie was the editor. In 1904 he succeeded in renaming it Die neue Rundschau. The magazine became one of the most important forums for modern literature and essay writing in the German Empire and the Weimar Republic. Due to the link to the S. Fischer-Verlag, the publisher's major writers were able to publish their works in first prints. Alfred Kerr and Robert Musil were among the reviewers. From 1919 to 1921, Alfred Döblin wrote for the magazine under the pen-name Linke Poot ("Left Paw").

Bie was succeeded by Rudolf Kayser and in 1932 by Peter Suhrkamp. Under the Nazis, the magazine was banned in late 1944. Gottfried Bermann-Fischer re-established it in 1945 in exile in Stockholm.

Neue Rundschau is based in Berlin and is published on a quarterly basis.

Content
Each issue of the quarterly has a thematic focus, to which writers, scientists and philosophers contribute. Furthermore, national and international writers are discussed, also the translations of literary texts.

First prints of literature
The magazine published several first works of literature; authors included Rainer Maria Rilke and Arthur Schnitzler. Thomas Mann's short story "Der kleine Herr Friedemann" was published in 1896. The 1904 title shows Gerhart Hauptmann's "Das Hirtenlied", Wilhelm Boelsche's "Zukunft der Menschheit", the novel Kreuzungen by Emil Strauß, Ellen Key's "Über Liebe und Ehe", Mann's "Ein Glück", Alfred Kerr's "Neue Schauspielkunst" and Richard Dehmel's "Der kleine Held". Hermann Hesse's "Kinderseele" was first printed in 1919. Musil wanted to publish Franz Kafka's "The Metamorphosis" in 1914 which was considered too long, but Kafka's story "A Hunger Artist" appeared in 1922.

References

Literature

External links
 Neue Rundschau
 Neue Rundschau at Hathitrust

1890 establishments in Germany
German-language magazines
Literary magazines published in Germany
Magazines established in 1890
Magazines published in Berlin
Magazines published in Stockholm
Quarterly magazines published in Germany
Theatre magazines
Weekly magazines published in Germany